Elia Caprile (born 25 August 2001) is an Italian professional footballer, who plays as a goalkeeper for Serie B club Bari.

Club career
Born in Verona and raised in the near comune of San Zeno di Montagna, Caprile started playing football at the local grassroots club Cadore before joining Chievo’s youth system. After coming through the various ranks, he was promoted to the first team in 2018, although he never made any senior appearances for the club.

After rejecting an official contract offer from Chievo, on 21 January 2020, Caprile joined English club Leeds United, signing a deal until June 2023. During his stint in Yorkshire, the goalkeeper mainly featured for the club's under-23 side and received several call-ups to the first team under manager Marcelo Bielsa, despite not having collected any official appearances.

On 7 August 2021, Caprile joined Serie C club Pro Patria on a season-long loan. He subsequently made his professional debut on 29 August 2021, starting the league match against AlbinoLeffe. During the season, he established himself as the team's first-choice goalkeeper, keeping a total amount of 12 clean sheets in 39 appearances, as Pro Patria reached the second round of the play-offs before losing to U.S. Triestina.

On 13 July 2022, it was announced that Caprile had completed a transfer to Serie B club S.S.C. Bari, signing a three-year deal with the club in the process.

International career 
Caprile has represented Italy at youth international level, having featured for the under-18 national team in 2019.

Career statistics

References

External links
 
 
 

2001 births
Living people
Footballers from Verona
Italian footballers
Association football goalkeepers
Serie B players
Serie C players
A.C. ChievoVerona players
Aurora Pro Patria 1919 players
Leeds United F.C. players
S.S.C. Bari players